ClearanceJobs is a career website based in Urbandale, Iowa. It serves individuals with active federal security clearances and provides a secure forum for employers to recruit cleared employees. It is known as the 'premier secure job board focused exclusively on candidates with active or current U.S. government security clearances.' 

ClearanceJobs is owned by DHI Group, Inc. (formerly known as Dice Holdings, Inc.) (NYSE: DHX). The website ClearanceJobs.com typically has more than 40,500 security clearance job listings, but companies frequently use the site to search for candidates, rather than posting jobs. In 2004 ClearanceJobs had 13,984 registered job seekers; in 2007, 95,000 job seekers with active federal security clearances. By April, 2011 the site had more than 375,000 registered cleared job seekers. Today, the website claims to have more than 1,056,000 registered security-cleared professionals. All registered users must have an active federal security clearance. Careers listed on the site range from custodial worker to counterintelligence analyst and cyber counterterrorism targeting analyst. The site has been used by hundreds of private companies as well as federal government agencies including defense companies, the CIA, FBI, Federal Reserve and Department of Homeland Security.

History
ClearanceJobs was founded in July 2002 by Evan Lesser and his wife. While they had the idea as early as the late 1990s while living and working in Northern Virginia, they didn't launch the site until 2002, after they moved to Atlanta and were spurred on by the need for qualified cleared talent following 9/11.

On September 16, 2004, ClearanceJobs was acquired by DHI Group, Inc.

In June 2010 ClearanceJobs launched the Cleared Network—the only vetted, password protected career networking platform designed exclusively for security-cleared professionals. The Cleared Network on ClearanceJobs.com is the largest recruiting network in the defense industry, and the nation's only secure, social recruiting site for cleared professionals.

Salary survey
In 2004 ClearanceJobs began conducting an annual salary survey of security-cleared professionals. In 2013 the compensation survey found that average salary and total compensation for cleared professionals participating in the survey fell for the first time ever. In 2014, security clearance compensation was relatively flat compared to the previous year, but the survey of nearly 21,000 security-cleared professionals found that the number of security-cleared professionals working in technology and cybersecurity saw average total salaries rise 1 percent to $102,164.

References

External links
Official Website
ClearanceJobs Blog
Workas.org Website

Employment websites in the United States